Temple B'nai Sholom may refer to:
 B'nai Sholom Temple, in Quincy, Illinois
 Temple B'nai Sholom (Huntsville, Alabama)

See also 
 Temple B'nai Shalom (Brookhaven, Mississippi)